The First Baptist Church is a historic Baptist church meeting house in New Bedford, Massachusetts.  The Greek Revival building was constructed in 1829, and has been a prominent landmark of the city ever since.  Its tower appears on the city seal.

The church was listed on the National Register of Historic Places in 1975, and included in the County Street Historic District in 1976.

In 1863 Major Henry M. Robert attended the annual general meeting at the First Baptist Church in New Bedford and on the spot was elected the chairman pro tem of the meeting. He was embarrassed because he knew nothing of how to run a meeting.  It was that meeting that caused him to begin studying parliamentary law, which culminated in the publication of the first edition of his book, Robert's Rules of Order, in 1876.

In 2015 the landmark was declared a National Treasure by the National Trust for Historic Preservation.

See also
National Register of Historic Places listings in New Bedford, Massachusetts

References

Churches completed in 1829
Churches on the National Register of Historic Places in Massachusetts
Churches in New Bedford, Massachusetts
National Register of Historic Places in New Bedford, Massachusetts
Historic district contributing properties in Massachusetts